Elise Båtnes (born 1971) is a Norwegian violinist. Since 2006, she has been leader of the Oslo Philharmonic orchestra.

Biography
Born on 24 June 1971 in Trondheim, Båtnes started playing the violin at the age of four. Four years later she appeared for the first time as a soloist with the Trondheim Symphony Orchestra. In 1981, when she was ten, she performed in a children's concert with the Oslo Philharmonic, appearing as a soloist a year later.

She studied under Dorothy DeLay in the United States, Ruggiero Ricci in Salzburg, David Takeno in London and Arve Tellefsen in Oslo. She also received guidance from Mariss Jansons of the Oslo Philharmonic. She has played as a soloist with orchestras in Sweden, Denmark, Germany and Belgian, participating in broadcasts from these countries as well as from Finland, Spain and the United States.

Båtnes first joined the Oslo Philharmonic when she was 19, returning as leader in 2006. Her most memorable concert with the orchestra was when she played Bruckner's 7th Symphony while on tour in England in 1991. She has also held positions as leader of the Danish National Symphony Orchestra in Copenhagen (2000–04) and the WDR Orchestra in Cologne (2004–08). In addition to Bruckner, she also enjoys playing the music of Richard Strauss, Gustav Mahler and Richard Wagner.

She is playing on the "Arditi" violin, made by Antonio Stradivari in 1689, on loan from Dextra Musica.

References

1971 births
Living people
Norwegian violinists
Concertmasters
Women classical violinists
Musicians from Trondheim
21st-century women musicians
21st-century classical violinists